Phaonia tuguriorum is a species of fly which is distributed across parts the Palaearctic.

References

Muscidae
Diptera of Europe
Insects described in 1763
Taxa named by Giovanni Antonio Scopoli